Joseph Mullaney (birth registered third ¼ 1934) is an English former professional rugby league footballer who played in the 1950s and 1960s. He played at representative level for England, and at club level for Featherstone Rovers (Heritage № 346) (captain), as an occasional goal-kicking , i.e. number 6.

Background
Joe Mullaney's birth was registered in Wakefield district, West Riding of Yorkshire, England.

Playing career

International honours
Joe Mullaney won a cap for England while at Featherstone Rovers in 1955 against Other Nationalities.

County honours
Joe Mullaney won caps for Yorkshire while at Featherstone Rovers; during the 1954–55 season against Cumberland and Lancashire, during the 1955–56 season against New Zealand, and during the 1957–58 season against Cumberland.

County Cup Final appearances
Joe Mullaney played , and was captain in Featherstone Rovers' 15-14 victory over Hull F.C. in the 1959–60 Yorkshire County Cup Final during the 1959–60 season at Headingley Rugby Stadium, Leeds on Saturday 31 October 1959.

Club career
Joe Mullaney made his début for Featherstone Rovers on Saturday 15 August 1953, he appears to have scored no drop-goals (or field-goals as they are currently known in Australasia), but prior to the 1974–75 season all goals, whether; conversions, penalties, or drop-goals, scored 2-points, consequently prior to this date drop-goals were often not explicitly documented, therefore '0' drop-goals may indicate drop-goals not recorded, rather than no drop-goals scored.

Testimonial match
Joe Mullaney's benefit season/testimonial match at Featherstone Rovers took place during the 1963–64 season.

Honoured at Featherstone Rovers
Joe Mullaney is a Featherstone Rovers Hall of Fame inductee.

References

External links

1934 births
Living people
England national rugby league team players
English rugby league players
Featherstone Rovers captains
Featherstone Rovers players
Rugby league players from Wakefield
Rugby league five-eighths
Yorkshire rugby league team players